Sigurd Høgaas (29 October 1892 – 12 December 1969) was a Norwegian politician for the Labour Party.

He served as a deputy representative to the Norwegian Parliament from Østfold during the term 1945–1949.

References

1892 births
1969 deaths
Labour Party (Norway) politicians
Deputy members of the Storting